Singliser See is a lake in West Hesse Depression, Hesse, Germany. At an elevation of 185 m, its surface area is 74 ha.

Lakes of Hesse
Borken, Hesse